David John Wheeler (born 4 October 1990) is an English professional footballer who plays as a midfielder for EFL League One club Wycombe Wanderers.

Career

Lewes
Wheeler started his career at Lewes making his first start in the Conference Premier 2008–09 season against Torquay United. He scored his first senior goal against Altrincham, scored 8 times the following season and 4 in his final season.

Staines Town
On 26 June 2011, due to travel commitments associated with his studies at Brunel University, Wheeler left Lewes and signed with Staines Town of the Conference South as it was the closest club to the campus. He made his Staines debut on 13 August, and scored his first goals for the club on the 29th, in a 2–1 home win against Boreham Wood. He finished the season with 9 goals, and was awarded both the Players Player and Club Player of the year awards. The following season, Wheeler scored a career-best 14 goals, which helped the club to avoid relegation, and repeated his achievements of the previous season by picking up both awards in the end of season honours. Wheeler was also captain of the team for the majority of his second season at the club.

Exeter City
On 2 August 2013, Wheeler signed a deal with Exeter City of Football League Two, after impressing on a trial. He made his professional debut a day later, in a 2–1 home win against Bristol Rovers. On 30 November 2013 Wheeler scored his first professional goal in a 2–2 draw against Bury. In the 2016/17 season, Wheeler played a pivotal role in helping Exeter City reach a League Two play-off final, by scoring 13 league goals and 20 goals in all competitions for City.

Queens Park Rangers
On 31 August 2017, Wheeler signed for Queens Park Rangers for an undisclosed fee on a three-year deal. Wheeler scored his first QPR goal in his first start for the club, opening the scoring in a 3–2 defeat to Middlesbrough.

On 7 August 2018, Wheeler joined League One club Portsmouth on a season-long loan deal. He scored his first goal for Portsmouth in a 4-0 EFL Trophy win over Gillingham on 4 September 2018. QPR recalled Wheeler from his loan spell on 24 January 2019, he made a total of 18 appearances for Portsmouth in all competitions. The following day, Wheeler joined League Two club Milton Keynes Dons on loan for the remainder of the 2018–19 season, reuniting with his former manager at Exeter City, Paul Tisdale.

Wycombe Wanderers
Wheeler signed for Wycombe Wanderers on 30 July 2019. It was a free transfer on a three-year deal. On 26 January 2023, Wheeler published an article saying football should become less reliant on sponsorship and advertising from betting companies.

International career
In 2008–09, Wheeler made 8 appearances for the England U18 Schoolboys.

Career statistics

Honours
Milton Keynes Dons
EFL League Two third-place promotion: 2018–19

Wycombe Wanderers
EFL League One play-offs: 2020

Individual
Staines Town Player of the Year: 2011–12, 2012–13
Exeter City Player of the Year: 2016–17

References

External links

David Wheeler player profile at Exeter City
Aylesbury United player profile

1990 births
Living people
Footballers from Brighton
English footballers
Association football wingers
Brighton & Hove Albion F.C. players
Lewes F.C. players
Staines Town F.C. players
Exeter City F.C. players
Queens Park Rangers F.C. players
Portsmouth F.C. players
Milton Keynes Dons F.C. players
Wycombe Wanderers F.C. players
National League (English football) players
English Football League players